Isis Hainsworth (born 22 September 1998) is a Scottish actress. She began her career in the West End. She is known for her roles in the BBC Three horror series Red Rose (2022) and the Netflix film Metal Lords (2022). She was named a 2022 Screen International Star of Tomorrow.

Early life
Hainsworth attended Leith Walk Primary School and then Drummond Community High School. She took extracurricular Higher and Advanced Higher Drama classes at Leith Academy alongside her standard school courses at Drummond. She also joined local theatre groups Lothian Youth Arts & Musicals Company and Strange Town Theatre. It was through the latter that she was suggested for Our Ladies of Perpetual Succour. Shortly after completing school in 2016, Hainsworth moved to London for her career.

Career
Hainsworth made her television debut in the 2016 with small roles in the BBC One miniseries One of Us (also known as Retribution) as Maddy and the ITV drama In Plainsight. She took over the lead role of Orla from Melissa Allan in the stage adaptation of Our Ladies of Perpetual Succour when it moved to the Duke of York's Theatre in 2017.

Hainsworth played Michelle McCullen and Louise Graham in the BBC One miniseries Wanderlust (2018) and The Victim (2019) respectively. She appeared in Moonlight / Nightschool at the Harold Pinter Theatre. For her performance as Hermia in A Midsummer Night's Dream at the Bridge Theatre, Hainsworth was nominated for a 2019 Ian Charleson Award. She appeared in the 2020 films Emma. as Elizabeth Martin and Misbehaviour as Jenny.

In 2022, Hainsworth starred as Rochelle Mason alongside Amelia Clarkson in the BBC Three horror series Red Rose and Emily Spector alongside Jaeden Martell in the Netflix teen band film Metal Lords. She also played Aelis in the Amazon Prime medieval comedy film Catherine Called Birdy.

Filmography

Film

Television

Stage

Awards and nominations

References

External links
 
 Isis Hainsworth at Curtis Brown

Living people
1998 births
21st-century Scottish actresses
People from Leith
Scottish film actresses
Scottish stage actresses
Scottish television actresses